The Hurt Business was a professional wrestling stable composed of MVP, Bobby Lashley, Shelton Benjamin and Cedric Alexander that performed on the WWE's Raw brand from 2020 to 2022.

Background 
Prior to the existence of the stable, in 2000, Shelton Benjamin debuted with the then-World Wrestling Federation's (WWF) developmental territory Ohio Valley Wrestling before debuting with the renamed World Wrestling Entertainment in 2002 as a tag team partner with Charlie Haas as the World's Greatest Tag Team in the SmackDown brand. Lashley also debuted in 2005 before switching brands various times until his release in 2008 and was a two-time ECW World Champion during his first tenure. A year later, Porter debuted in 2006 at the No Mercy pay-per-view event and was the then-longest reigning United States Champion, holding it for 343 days. After both leaving WWE in 2010, Benjamin and MVP joined forces in New Japan Pro-Wrestling through 2012 to form the tag team "Black Dynamite". MVP also worked together with Lashley in Total Nonstop Action Wrestling through much of 2014 as part of the "Beat Down Clan" stable, during which Lashley became a two-time TNA World Heavyweight Champion. Cedric Alexander made his WWE debut in 2016, in the Cruiserweight Classic, while Benjamin and Lashley both returned to the company in 2017 and 2018 respectively. MVP returned to WWE at the 2020 Royal Rumble event also during 2020 both Shelton and Cedric would feud over the WWE 24/7 Championship and R-Truth

History

Formation and championship success (2020-2021) 
On the May 11, 2020 episode of Raw, MVP aligned himself with Bobby Lashley, with MVP promising to manage Lashley to a WWE Championship reign. At Backlash, Lashley failed to capture the WWE Championship from Drew McIntyre following a distraction from his on-screen wife Lana. The following night on Raw, Lashley blamed Lana for his loss at Backlash and he would then ask for a divorce, thus ending their romantic storyline.

On the June 22 episode of Raw, Lashley attacked United States Champion Apollo Crews and placed him in his full nelson hold after he turned down MVP's offer to join them. After defeating Crews in a non-title match, MVP unveiled a new United States Championship design and declared himself the "real" United States Champion. This set up a match between Crews and MVP at The Horror Show at Extreme Rules; however, Crews was pulled out from the match the day of the event, with the reason given by WWE being that he was not declared medically fit to compete, while media such as Forbes reported rumors that Crews had tested positive for COVID-19. As a result, MVP won the match by forfeit, and afterwards, declared himself the new United States Champion; however, this was not recognized by WWE. The following night on Raw, MVP and Lashley added Shelton Benjamin into their group as the duo helped Benjamin capture the 24/7 Championship from R-Truth, and the group was formally named "The Hurt Business", and the faction were often presented as a high-end bunch, often wearing expensive, fashionable suits. Crews returned from hiatus on the August 3 episode of Raw and retained his title against MVP, taking the new title design in the process. Following this, The Hurt Business began feuding with Crews' allies, Ricochet and Cedric Alexander, with both groups exchanging victories and attacks throughout the following weeks on Raw. During his time in the stable, Benjamin won the 24/7 Championships two more times, both coming on the August 17 episode of Raw.

While MVP lost another title match against Crews at SummerSlam, Lashley would defeat Crews at Payback to win the WWE United States Championship. On the September 7 episode of Raw, during a six-man tag team match between Crews, Alexander and Ricochet against The Hurt Business, Alexander betrayed Crews and Ricochet, attacking them and helping The Hurt Business win the match and subsequently celebrated with them, thus turning Alexander heel and joining the group as a result.

On the September 14 episode of Raw, they began a feud with Retribution (Mace, Slapjack, T-Bar and Reckoning) regarding the latter's motives and actions. On the October 5 episode of Raw, The Hurt Business also teased a possible face turn against Retribution after Mustafa Ali established himself as a heel after revealing that he is the leader of the Retribution. On the October 19 episode of Raw, however, The Hurt Business remained heels after viciously assaulting Titus O'Neil after the latter requested to join the group, but was rejected. Six days later at Hell in a Cell, Lashley offered an open challenge for his United States Championship towards any member of Retribution, which was answered by Slapjack, whom Lashley managed to defeat to retain. After the match, the rest of Retribution attacked Lashley, but the rest of the Hurt Business saved Lashley and fought them off.

On the November 2 episode of Raw, Cedric Alexander and Shelton Benjamin defeated The New Day (Kofi Kingston and Xavier Woods) in a non-title match. They challenged The New Day for the Raw Tag Team Championships on the November 16 episode of Raw, in a losing effort. On December 20 at TLC: Tables, Ladders & Chairs, Benjamin and Alexander captured the Raw Tag Team Championships from The New Day. At Elimination Chamber, Lashley lost the United States Championship to Riddle in a triple threat match, when the latter pinned John Morrison, ending his reign at 175 days. Later in the night, Lashley viciously attacked Drew McIntyre after he successfully retained the WWE Title inside the Chamber, thus allowing The Miz to cash in his Money in the Bank briefcase to become the new WWE Champion, under the condition that Miz guaranteed him a title match the next day. Lashley would go on to defeat Miz in a lumberjack match to win the WWE Championship on the March 1 episode of Raw, becoming only the third African-American to win WWE's original world championship. The following week, Lashley retained the title against The Miz.

On the March 15 episode of Raw, Alexander and Benjamin lost the Raw Tag Team Championship back to The New Day, ending their reign at 85 days. On the March 29 episode of Raw, Lashley lambasted Alexander and Benjamin due to them losing the Raw Tag Team Championships and losing to Drew McIntyre in a 2-on-1 handicap match, a loss that meant they would be barred from ringside at Lashley's WWE Championship match at WrestleMania 37 against McIntyre. This led to Lashley attacking Alexander and Benjamin and declaring that The Hurt Business was over for the two of them, thus kicking them out of the faction. While Benjamin and Alexander subsequently started to feud with each other, MVP continued to reference The Hurt Business on television, as well as state on social media that the group was still in action, but it just composed of him and Lashley.

Lashley would go on to retain his title by defeating Drew McIntyre in three consecutive title defenses. The first was in the opening match of WrestleMania 37, the second at WrestleMania Backlash in a triple threat match against McIntyre and Strowman, then finally at Hell in a Cell in a Last Chance Hell in a Cell match. This removed McIntyre from title contention for the duration of Lashley's reign. Lashley would begin feuding with Kofi Kingston where a match for the WWE Championship was made between the two at Money in the Bank. At the event, Lashley retained the title against Kingston. On the July 19 episode of Raw, Goldberg would return and challenge Lashley for the WWE Championship. Initially, Lashley would reject the challenge at first, but on the August 2 episode of Raw, Lashley would accept Goldberg's challenge and the match would be made official for SummerSlam. At the event, Lashley would retain the WWE Championship due to referee stoppage after Goldberg could no longer continue. On the September 13 episode of Raw, after successfully defending the title against Randy Orton, Lashley lost the WWE Championship to Big E who cashed in his Money in the Bank briefcase, ending his reign at 196 days. On the same episode of Raw, MVP was put out of action due to injury for an undetermined period of time.

Reunion (2021–2022) 
On the September 27 episode of Raw, Benjamin and Alexander helped Lashley fight off The New Day and in the process, reuniting The Hurt Business. During the 2021 WWE Draft on October 4, The Hurt Business was drafted to remain on Raw. At Crown Jewel, Cedric Alexander and Shelton Benjamin would lose to The Usos on the pre-show, while Lashley would later be defeated by Goldberg in a No Holds Barred match. On the November 22, 2021 episode of Raw, Alexander defeated Reggie to win the WWE 24/7 Championship, however he immediately lost it to Dana Brooke.

Departure of Lashley and MVP and final separation (2022) 
On the January 10, 2022 episode of Raw, Lashley told Alexander and Benjamin that he worked alone and that "there is no more Hurt Business", and later that night the duo would attack him, confirming MVP and Lashley's departure and dissolving the team as a stable in the process.

Benjamin and Alexander would continue to function as a tag team and continued to attack Lashley on the following episodes of Raw, being referred to as The Hurt Business by the commentary team until August 8, 2022 when Alexander defeated Benjamin in the Main Event tapings.

Teased reunion (2023–present) 
On the January 9, 2023 episode of Raw, Benjamin and Alexander reunited to take part in a Tag Team Turmoil match. Earlier during the show, Lashley and MVP teased an alliance, with MVP crediting himself for reuniting Benjamin and Alexander, and getting Lashley reinstated on Raw after being suspended. On the February 6 edition of Raw, Benjamin and Alexander defeated Alpha Academy with MVP in their corner further hinting at a possible reunion.

Timeline

Championships and accomplishments 
 CBS Sports
 Comeback Wrestler of the Year (2020) – MVP
 Pro Wrestling Illustrated
 Comeback of the Year (2020) – MVP
 WWE
 WWE Championship (1 time) – Lashley
 WWE United States Championship (1 time) – Lashley
 WWE Raw Tag Team Championship (1 time) – Benjamin and Alexander
 WWE 24/7 Championship  (4 times) – Benjamin (3), Alexander (1) 
 Slammy Award for Trash Talker of the Year (2020)

References

External links 
 .
 .
 .
 .

WWE teams and stables